Serhiy Vasylyovych Kuznetsov (born 30 November 1950 in Kamenolomnya, Crimea) is a retired Ukrainian and Soviet football player. He is the brother of Viktor Kuznetsov. He is often confused with other Soviet footballers of the same name. Since retiring, he has moved to Kyiv and is a conductor on one of the trains between Kyiv and Moscow.

Honours
 Soviet Top League winner: 1972, 1975, 1977.
 UEFA Cup Winners' Cup winner: 1975.

International career
Kuznetsov made his debut for USSR on 29 June 1972 in a friendly match against Uruguay. He was known for his speed, excellent dribbling, and accurate long passes. After retiring, he was briefly the coach of "Yugostal" a club team from Yenakiyevo from 1990 to 1991.

References

  Profile

1950 births
Living people
People from Saky Raion
Russian footballers
Soviet footballers
Soviet Union international footballers
Ukrainian footballers
Soviet Top League players
SC Tavriya Simferopol players
FC Dynamo Kyiv players
FC Zenit Saint Petersburg players
FC SKA Rostov-on-Don players
Association football midfielders
Association football defenders